Big John Dick Mountain is a summit in Fannin County, Georgia, in the United States.

The Benton MacKaye Trail passes near the summit of the mountain.

See also
List of mountains in Georgia (U.S. state)

References

Mountains of Fannin County, Georgia
Mountains of Georgia (U.S. state)